Spidey and His Amazing Friends  (also known as Marvel's Spidey and His Amazing Friends) is a computer-animated superhero children's television series produced by Atomic Cartoons (who also produced Marvel Super Hero Adventures) that premiered on Disney Junior on August 6, 2021. The show features young versions of the Marvel characters.

After the series premiere, the series was renewed for a second season which premiered on August 19, 2022. In June 2022, the series was renewed for a third season.

Plot
The series follows the adventures of Peter Parker / Spidey, Miles Morales / Spin, and Gwen Stacy / Ghost-Spider as they fight villains such as Rhino, Doc Ock, Green Goblin, Electro, Black Cat, and Sandman. Spidey, Spin, and Ghost-Spider would sometimes receive aid from other superheroes such as Black Panther, Ms. Marvel, Hulk, Iron Man, Ant-Man, Wasp, and Reptil.

Characters

Main
 Peter Parker / Spidey (voiced by Benjamin Valic) - A titular web-slinging superhero.
 WEB-STER (voiced by Nicholas Roye) - A super-computer in Web-Quarters that assists Spidey, Spin, and Ghost-Spider.
 TRACE-E (vocal effects provided by Dee Bradley Baker) - A Spider-Bot who is Spidey's sidekick.
 Miles Morales / Spin (voiced by Jakari Fraser) - Peter's best friend and second web-slinging superhero.
 TWIST-E (vocal effects provided by Dee Bradley Baker) - A Spider-Bot who is Spin's sidekick.
 Gwen Stacy / Ghost-Spider (voiced by Lily Sanfelippo) - A friend of Peter and Miles and third web-slinging superhero.
 TWIRL-E (vocal effects provided by Nora Wyman) - A Spider-Bot who is Ghost-Spider's sidekick.

Supporting
 Aunt May (voiced by Melanie Minichino) - Peter's paternal aunt.
 Rio Morales (voiced by Gabrielle Ruiz) - Miles' mother who is an ER doctor.
 Jeff Morales (né Davis) (voiced by Eugene Byrd) - Miles' father who is a police officer for the NYPD.
 Helen Stacy (voiced by Kari Wahlgren) - Gwen's mother who is a detective for the NYPD.
 George Stacy (voiced by Scott Porter) - Gwen's father who is a police captain for the NYPD.
 Gloria Morales (voiced by Sophia Ramos) - Miles' grandmother who lives in Puerto Rico.

Allies
 Ms. Marvel (voiced by Sandra Saad) - An Inhuman who can extend her limbs.
 Black Panther (voiced by Tru Valentino) - The king of Wakanda.
 Hulk (voiced by Armen Taylor as an adult, Sami Sharkaway as a baby (Li'l Hulk)) - A monstrous humanoid superhero with gamma-powered super strength.
 Tony Stark / Iron Man (voiced by John Stamos) - An armored superhero who is the CEO of Stark Industries.
 Ant-Man (voiced by Sean Giambrone) - A superhero who can change his size thanks to the particles that he invented and possesses the strength of an ant.
 Wasp (voiced by Maya Tuttle) - A superhero who can fly and change her size with the same particles. She is Ant-Man's partner.
 Reptil (voiced by Hoku Ramirez) - A superhero who can become different dinosaurs.

Villains
 Doc Ock (voiced by Kelly Ohanian) - A female criminal with mechanical tentacles.
 Octobots - A group of octopus-themed robots that work for Doc Ock.
 CAL (vocal effects provided by Dee Bradley Baker) - Doc Ock's Octobot minion.
 Green Goblin (voiced by JP Karliak) - A male goblin-themed criminal that rides on a glider and throws pumpkin bombs (referred to as "pumpkin pranks" in this show).
 Rhino (voiced by Justin Shenkarow) - A male rhino-themed supervillain.
 Electro (voiced by Stephanie Lemelin) - A female supervillain with electricity powers.
 Black Cat / Felicia Hardy (voiced by Jaiden Klein) - A young female thief who dresses like a cat.
 Sandman (voiced by Thomas F. Wilson) - A male sand-based supervillain who can generate, control, and become sand.

Other characters
 Mr. Von Carnegie (voiced by John Eric Bentley) - The owner of the museum.
 Librarian (voiced by Sainty Nelsen) - The unnamed librarian at New York City's library.
 Isla Coralton (voiced by Bindi Irwin) - An oceanographer that works at the local aquarium.
 Tabitha (voiced by Alessandra Perez)
 Mayor (voiced by Melique Berger) - The unnamed Mayor of New York City.
 Junkyard Jerry (voiced by Hayden Bishop) - The owner of the city Junkyard.
 Ms. Kimanthi (voiced by Kittie KaBoom) - A zookeeper.
 Mr. Kim (voiced by Tim Dang) - Owner of the city Community Center.
 Concert Announcer (voiced by Patrick Stump) – An announcer of the concert.

Episodes

Series overview

Season 1 (2021–22)

Every episode was directed by Darren Bachynski, with storyboards provided by Stephanie Blakey.

Season 2: Glow Webs Glow (2022–23)

Shorts

Season 1 (2021)

Season 2 (2022)

Production

Development
Marvel Animation announced its first preschool series Spidey and His Amazing Friends in August 2019. Disney Junior renewed the series for a second season in August 2021. On June 15, 2022, Disney Junior renewed the series for a third season. Marvel Studios took over production of the series starting with season 2.

Music
Patrick Stump, known from the pop punk rock band Fall Out Boy, performed the theme song for the series and is the songwriter and composer. Stump, a longtime Marvel fan, used themes from previous Spider-Man media as inspiration for the series' theme song.

Release
Spidey and His Amazing Friends premiered with a series of 11 short episodes titled Meet Spidey and His Amazing Friends on June 21, 2021, on Disney Channel and Disney Junior, followed by Disney+ on July 16. It also premiered on September 11, 2021, in Southeast Asia.

The full series premiered on August 6 with a simulcast on Disney Junior and Disney Channel, later on Disney+ on September 22.

The second season of Meet Spidey and His Amazing Friends premiered on July 18, 2022, on Disney Channel and Disney Junior, followed by Disney+ on August 17.

The second season of the series premiered on August 19, 2022, with a simulcast on Disney Junior and Disney Channel, later on Disney+ this fall.

On 10 October 2022 it debuted on CBeebies in the UK, making this the first show based on a Disney property to premiere on said network.

Reception

Critical reception
Adam Levine of Looper ranked Spidey and His Amazing Friends 19th in their "Every 2021 Superhero Movie And TV Show Ranked" list, asserting, "Bright, colorful, and wonderfully animated, it doesn't get high marks from comic book diehards, but has been nonetheless well-reviewed by parents of its young target audience for its wholesome stories and message of teamwork." Polly Conway of Common Sense Media rated the series 3 out of 5 stars, writing, "The whole "Marvel Babies" concept may be a little odd for parents, and more cynical viewers might see the show as a way to get even younger kids interested in the vast, lucrative Marvel franchise. But overall the show is charming, well-paced, and a solid choice for younger siblings who aren't ready for the movies or more mature cartoons." Dakota Mayes of MovieWeb ranked Spidey and His Amazing Friends 5th in their "Best Animated Spider-Man Series" list, stating, "Spider-Man and His Amazing Friends is different from all others on this list in that it is geared towards toddlers. This modern update of the classic 80's cartoon left out Iceman and Firestar, and traded them with other popular web-slingers like Ghost-Spider/Gwen Stacy and Miles Morales, nicknamed 'Spin' to avoid confusion with Peter Parker's alter ego. This trio appeared in two computer-animated shorts per episode that were filled with youthful fun and adventures. Each adorably animated episode featured a classic Spider-Man villain committing some mild manner of mischief. More than that, the series even included an occasional appearance from Marvel superheroes like Black Panther and Captain Marvel to add to the age-appropriate fun. This show was such a hit with its targeted age group that it earned itself a second season, which is expected to air sometime in 2022."

Adaptations

English version by Marvel
Spidey and his Amazing Friends (2022-04-04/2022-05-04): Free comic with stories from My First Comic Reader. Free Comic Book Day issue includes 2-page preview.

English version by Disney Books
Spidey and His Amazing Friends: Panther Patience (ISBN 1-36806988-6/978-1-36806988-5, 2021-08-03)
Spidey and His Amazing Friends: Meet Team Spidey (ISBN 1-36806990-8/978-1-36806990-8, 2021-08-03)
World of Reading: Spidey and His Amazing Friends: Super Hero Hiccups (ISBN 1-36806992-4/978-1-36806992-2, 2021-08-03)
Spidey and His Amazing Friends: A Very Spidey Christmas (ISBN 1-36807404-9/978-1-36807404-9, 2021-09-07)
Spidey and His Amazing Friends: Spidey Saves the Day (ISBN 1-36807605-X/978-1-36807605-0, 2021-12-28): Includes World of Reading: Spidey and His Amazing Friends: Super Hero Hiccups, 5-Minute Spider-Man Stories, 5-Minute Marvel Stories, World of Reading: This is Miles Morales, World of Reading: Five Super Hero Stories!, Snow Day for Groot!, Marvel Storybook Collection.
Spidey and His Amazing Friends: Team Spidey Does It All! (ISBN 1-36807607-6/978-1-36807607-4, 2022-02-01)
Spidey and His Amazing Friends: Trick or TRACE-E (ISBN 1-36807890-7/978-1-36807890-7, 2022-07-05)
Spidey and His Amazing Friends: Construction Destruction (ISBN 1-36807877-X/978-1-36807877-1, 2022-08-30)
World of Reading: Spidey and His Amazing Friends: Housesitting at Tony's (ISBN 1-36807880-X/978-1-36807880-1, 2022-09-13)
Spidey and His Amazing Friends: Let's Swing, Spidey Team! (ISBN 1-36808480-X/978-1-36808480-2, 2023-01-03)

References

External links

Marvel page: TV series, comic

2020s American animated television series
2020s Canadian animated television series
2020s American children's television series
2020s Canadian children's television series
2020s preschool education television series
2021 American television series debuts
2021 Canadian television series debuts
American children's animated action television series
American children's animated adventure television series
American children's animated comic science fiction television series
American children's animated science fantasy television series
American children's animated superhero television series
American computer-animated television series
American preschool education television series
Animated preschool education television series
Canadian children's animated action television series
Canadian children's animated adventure television series
Canadian children's animated comic science fiction television series
Canadian children's animated science fantasy television series
Canadian children's animated superhero television series
Canadian computer-animated television series
Canadian preschool education television series
Disney Junior original programming
English-language television shows
Marvel Animation
Marvel Comics child superheroes
Animated television series about children
Animated Spider-Man television series
Television shows based on Marvel Comics
Television series by Disney
CBeebies
Fictional trios